Selectivity, also known as circuit breaker discrimination, is the coordination of overcurrent protection devices so that a fault in the installation is cleared by the protection device located immediately upstream of the fault. The purpose of selectivity is to minimize the impact of a failure on the network. Faults in an installation are, for example, overload and short circuit.

There are four ways in which selectivity is achieved:
 Current selectivity: different breaking capacities
 Time selectivity: time delay before tripping of a breaker
 Energy based selectivity: analysis of the current waves
 Zone selective interlocking: communication between the breakers, forwarding a time delay instruction

References

Electrical engineering
Electrical safety